Portage Lake is a glacial lake in the Chugach National Forest of Alaska. It sits in a long, heavily glaciated valley, and abuts the calving face of Portage Glacier at its southern end. The lake has only become visible since approximately 1914, with the rapid retreat of Portage Glacier.

Access and recreation
The western shore of Portage Lake is easily accessed via a large parking lot at the lakeside Begich Boggs Visitor Center, just off the Portage Glacier Highway. Portage Glacier Cruises operates a short glacier cruise, which takes visitors near the face of the glacier. Recreational boating in the lake was illegal in the past, due to rolling icebergs and the calving face of Portage Glacier at the far end of the lake, but is now legal, though proper precautions must be taken for the challenging conditions.
During winter and spring, the lake is a popular destination for cross-country skiing, kite skiing, mountain biking, skating, snowshoe running, and hiking. The "crust skiing" season of mid spring is especially prized by skiers. Skiers must take appropriate precautions near Portage Glacier, as the constant movement of the glacier's calving face breaks up even thick lake ice and can create patches of open water or unstable ice near the glacier's face, even in midwinter.

Fatalities and incidents
Its low temperature year-round makes Portage Lake a potentially dangerous locale for swimming or other water activities.
 July 2012. Utah resident Levi Matheson Taylor saved an Anchorage resident from drowning after he attempted to swim  to a gravel bar.
 October 2012. One man dead after attempting to retrieve a canoe.

References

Bodies of water of Anchorage, Alaska
Lakes of Alaska